Davi Kopenawa Yanomami, name also written Davi Kobenawä Yanomamö (born Toototobi, Brazil, c. 1956), is a Yanomami shaman and Portuguese-speaking spokesperson for the Yanomami People in Brazil.  He became known for his advocacy regarding tribal issues and Amazon rainforest conservation when the tribal rights organization Survival International invited him to accept the Right Livelihood Award on its behalf in 1989. In 2019, Yanomami and the Hutukara Yanomami Association were also awarded the Right Livelihood Award. Yanomami spoke to both the British and Swedish parliaments about the catastrophic impact on Yanomami health as a consequence of the illegal invasion of their land by 40,000 ‘garimpeiros’ or goldminers. Prince Charles publicly called the situation ‘genocide’. In a seven-year period from 1987 to 1993 one fifth of the Yanomami died from malaria and other diseases transmitted by the miners.

His nickname ‘Kopenawa’ (hornet) was given to him in recognition of his ability to fight for his people.

Early life and education
Davi Kopenawa Yanomami was born near the Rio Toototobi near the border of Venezuela. He learned Portuguese from a Christian mission run by New Tribes Mission, an American evangelical organization specializing in the proselytization of isolated peoples. The acquisition of Portuguese language proficiency (then rare among the Yanomami) enabled Yanomami to interact with Brazil's Lusophone majority both directly and through the mass media.

In his own words translated from Portuguese:

Yanomami is the son-in-law of another traditional tribal leader with whom he apprenticed to be a shaman. His wife lost much of her family to measles and other diseases brought to the area in the 1970s by road construction crews and garimpeiros (small-time gold miners). Yanomami has mentioned this as part of his personal motivation to speak out on his people's behalf. Yanomami was orphaned as a child when his parents died from diseases transmitted by outsiders.

Career
In the 1980s, he began working for the Brazilian government organization Fundação Nacional do Índio (FUNAI) at a post in Demini in the center of Yanomami territory as an intermediary between the government and indigenous peoples with whom outsiders had little or no contact. He also accompanied health workers to Yanomami villages and has worked closely with organizations such as Comissão Pró-Yanomami (CCPY) and Survival International in the fight for the integrity of Yanomami lands in Brazil.

Since the invasion of Yanomami territory began in 1987 by illegal rubber tappers, Yanomami has worked for their removal from the area and for the creation of a parkland therein. His action resulted in death threats from the tappers. After a major international campaign led by Yanomami, Survival International and CCPY, the Brazilian government finally recognized Yanomami land rights in 1992 just before the UN's Earth Summit.

Yanomami has advocated for over 20 years and visited many countries with his message about the importance of respecting indigenous peoples rights and their fundamental and unique role in conserving the rainforest for the benefit of humanity.

In 2004, Yanomami and other Yanomami in Brazil set up an organization called Hutukara to defend their rights. As well as advocating for Yanomami rights, it runs educational projects where Yanomami teachers work in the communities teaching literacy, maths, geography and human rights.

Yanomami continues to speak out about the dangers facing the Yanomami. He has warned about the impact large scale mining will have on the Yanomami if the Brazilian congress votes to allow mining on indigenous lands.

In a CNN interview published in February  2023, Yanomami criticized Jair Bolsonaro, who served as the president of Brazil from 2019 to 2022, for encouraging mining in the Amazon Rainforest. He also expressed hope for improvement of the situation with the crackdown starting in 2023 on illegal mining by the administration of Luiz Inácio Lula da Silva and the appointment of the first Brazilian Minister of Indigenous People, Sônia Guajajara.

Criticism
Yanomami's unique role among his people has been commented on skeptically even by those sympathetic to him and his cause. Anthropologist Napoleon Chagnon wrote regarding Yanomami:

Survival International and many others with extensive experience of the Yanomami have severely criticized Chagnon's work which detrimentally portrays the Yanomami as "sly, aggressive, and intimidating" and falsely claims that they "live in a state of chronic warfare". It was referred to by the Brazilian government when it planned to fragment Yanomami land in 1988, in a proposal which would have been catastrophic for them and which was only prevented by a vigorous campaign.

Chagnon's views in this matter were criticized by investigative journalist Patrick Tierney in his controversial book Darkness in El Dorado.

Awards
In 1988, Yanomami received an award from the United Nations Environment Programme for his work protecting the forest against rubber tappers and establishing Yanomami Park.

In 2009, he was honoured with the Bartolome de las Casas award in Spain and later gave a speech to the UK parliament where he warned that the goldminers are once again invading Yanomami land and disease is spreading.

Davi Kopenawa Yanomami, together with the Hutukara Yanomami Association (Brazil), received the Right Livelihood Award in 2019 "for their courageous determination to protect the forests and biodiversity of the Amazon, and the lands and culture of its indigenous peoples".

See also
Stephen Corry
Roy Sesana

References

External links
An Open Letter to All Peoples of the Earth
Survival International media kit on Davi Kopenawa Yanomami

1956 births
Living people
Indigenous peoples in Brazil
Indigenous activists of the Americas
Brazilian religious leaders
People from Amazonas (Brazilian state)
Yanomami
Brazilian people of indigenous peoples descent